The 1987 Michigan State Spartans football team represented Michigan State University as a member of the Big Ten Conference during the 1987 NCAA Division I-A football season. Led by fifth-year head coach George Perles, the Spartans compiled an overall record of 9–2–1 with a mark 7–0–1 in conference play, winning the Big Ten title. Michigan State beat USC to win the 1988 Rose Bowl and finished the season ranked No. 8 in the AP Poll and the Coaches Poll. The first game of the season, also against USC, was the first night game ever at Spartan Stadium.

Schedule

Personnel

Game summaries

USC

at Notre Dame

Florida State

at Iowa

Michigan

MICH - Gillette 31 FG
MSU - White 6 Run (Langeloh kick)
MSU - White 2 Run (Langeloh kick)
MICH - Morris 18 D. Brown (pass good)
MSU - Langeloh 42 FG
Passing: MICH D. Brown 12/26, 158 Yds, TD, 7 INT, MSU McAllister 5/7, 68 Yds
Rushing: MICH Morris 31/108, MSU White 34/185, 2 TD
Receiving: MICH Kolesar 4/65, MSU Bouyer 2/38

at Northwestern

Illinois

at Ohio State

Purdue

Indiana

at Wisconsin

Rose Bowl vs. USC

1988 NFL Draft
The following players were selected in the 1988 NFL Draft. Team members Tony Mandarich, Andre Rison and Percy Snow were drafted in later years.

References

Michigan State
Michigan State Spartans football seasons
Big Ten Conference football champion seasons
Rose Bowl champion seasons
Michigan State Spartans football